David James (born 1 September 1985) is a Welsh rugby league footballer for the South Wales Scorpions in the Championship One.

James was born in Blackwood, Caerphilly. He also plays for the Wales national rugby league team.

References 
 dead link

1985 births
Living people
Blackwood Bulldogs players
Rugby league fullbacks
Rugby league players from Caerphilly County Borough
South Wales Scorpions players
Wales national rugby league team players
Welsh rugby league players